Catherine Rey, born in 1956 at Saintes, in Charente-Maritime, is a French writer.

Biography  
After studying literature in Bordeaux and before devoting herself fully to writing, Rey worked for several years as a teacher of French literature. In 1997, she left her work to settle in Perth, Western Australia, where her father was born in 1918. Her paternal grandparents had emigrated to Australia in 1912. She lived in Perth for eight years before returning to Charente-Maritime in 2006. She returned to Australia in 2008 and currently lives in Illawarra.

Rey graduated from the University of Bordeaux III with a  degree in Modern Literature. She also holds a PhD from the University of Western Australia. Her dissertation, The New Babel, deals with language, identity and moral in the works of Emil Cioran, Milan Kundera and Andrei Makine. Rey analyses how these three writers have abandoned their original language to adopt French in their creative work. Rey is the author of several novels and short stories. Highly noticed by critics and booksellers right after the launch of her first novel L'ami intime published in 1994 by Le Temps qu'il fait, she was selected as a finalist for the 1995 Prix Femina for a First Novel. Continuing her exploration of the dark and sordid side of humanity, she published Les jours heureux and Eloge de l'oubli over the next two years. She published Lucy comme les chiens in 2001. Rey takes the reader through the painful journey of an intellectually disabled young woman who, despite the beatings and humiliations of an abusive mother and an abusive old man, remains loving and faithful.

In 2003, her novel, Ce que racontait Jones, published by Phébus, received the Thyde Monnier scholarship from the Société des gens de lettres, and was shortlisted for the prestigious Prix Renaudot literary award and the Prix Femina literary award that same year.

In 2007, Rey published Une femme en marche, an autobiographical novel in which she confronts her mother and her family's past.

In September 2010, she published Les extraordinaires aventures de John Lofty Oakes, a novel that retraces the heroic quest of a man of small size but possessing the gift of crying tears of gold in the style of a philosophical tale and an epic. Being the object of all desires for fortune that flows from his eyes, this Tom Thumb embarks on an extraordinary journey that takes him from Guildford, Western Australia, where he was born, to Panaji, a city on the West coast of India, passing through Fiji, before finally returning to his homeland.

In 2011, Rey published Plus calme que le sommeil, a meditation on death in the form of a long love letter.

In 2018, she published The Lovers, her first novel in English. In The Sydney Morning Herald, author and critic Catherine Ford described it as a "timely and sophisticated thriller".

Work 

Novels in French :

 L’Ami intime, Le temps qu’il fait, 1994
Les jours heureux, Le Temps qu’il fait, 1995
Eloge de l’oubli, Le temps qu’il fait, 1996
Lucie comme les chiens, Le temps qu’il fait, 2001
Ce que racontait Jones, Phébus, 2003
Une femme en marche, Phébus, 2007
Les extraordinaires aventures de John Lofty Oakes, Joëlle Losfeld Publishing, 2010
Plus calme que le sommeil, Le Temps qu’il fait, 2011

Novels translated into foreign languages :

In English :

The Spruiker's Tale (Ce que racontait Jones), Andrew Riemer, Giramondo (Australian Edition), 2005
Stepping Out, Translation: Julie Rose, Giramondo (Australian edition), 2008

	 In German : 
Was Jones erzählt (Ce que racontait Jones), Translation: Claudia Kalscheuer, Unionsverlag (German edition), 2005
Novel in English :
       
The Lovers, Edited by Gazebo Books, Sydney, 2018,

Beautiful books 
Memoires d'un vignoble, photographs by Jean-Luc Chapin, Éditions la Part des Anges, 1998

Articles and essays
 How Do The Salamanders die? Essay, 2005, Heat n.9, Giramondo, Sydney.
Do You Still Write? Essay, 2011, In Australian Journal of French Studies, Volume XLVIII, Number 3, 2011, University of Sydney. 
To Make A Prairie It Takes a Clover and a Bee, Essay, 2013, In Joyful Strains, an anthology published by Affirm Press, Melbourne.  
Jean Mariotti, Six poems, translation, 2013, In Cordite Journal on line, Kent Mc Karthy, editor.

Adaptation for the stage 

In 2010, the director Valérie Goma adapted for the Lucy theater as the dogs, repositioning the world of Catherine Rey's little heroine in the context of a multicultural and multilingual Guiana plateau, where many questions of identity related migrations of populations. Created in Cayenne under the title of Lucy, the play will tour the region (in Guyana, Suriname and Brazil) and Guadeloupe, before being presented in 2011 at the Chapel of the Word Incarnate as part of the Festival off of Avignon.

Awards 

	 1995 : L'ami intime selected for the Femina Prize of the first novel.  
        1995 : L'ami intime Prix Fureur de Lire from the City of Cherbourg. 
 1995 : L'ami intime Prix of the first novel at the Chambéry Festival.
	 1996: Eloge de l’oubli Prix des Mouettes from the Regional Council of Charente-Maritime. 
	 2001: Lucie comme les chiens Book Award of Poitou-Charente. 
	 2003 : Ce que racontait Jones, shortlisted for the Renaudot, Voted winner in the first round of voting. 
	 2003 : Ce que racontait Jones shortlisted for the Femina. 
	 2003 : Ce que racontait Jones awarded by the Thyde Monnier Scholarship of the Société des Gens de Lettres. 
        2005 : The Spruiker's Tale Longlisted for the International IMPAC, Dublin.

See also
 List of French-language authors

References

20th-century French novelists
21st-century French novelists
French women novelists
1956 births
Living people
21st-century French women writers
20th-century French women writers